Justin Carl Steele (born July 11, 1995) is an American professional baseball pitcher for the Chicago Cubs of Major League Baseball (MLB).

Amateur career
Steele attended George County High School in Lucedale, Mississippi. He was drafted by the Chicago Cubs in the fifth round of the 2014 Major League Baseball draft.

Professional career
Steele made his professional debut with the Arizona League Cubs, compiling a 2.89 ERA in 18.2 innings pitched. Steele pitched 2015 with the Eugene Emeralds, going 3–1 with a 2.66 ERA in ten starts, and 2016 with the South Bend Cubs, pitching to a 5–7 record with a 5.00 ERA in 19 starts. He started 2017 with the Myrtle Beach Pelicans, but had his season cut short in August due to injury which required Tommy John Surgery. In 20 starts prior to the injury, he went 6–7 with a 2.92 ERA. He returned from the injury in 2018 and pitched for the Arizona League Cubs, Myrtle Beach and Tennessee Smokies, pitching to a combined 2–2 record with a 2.31 ERA in 11 starts. After the season, he played in the Arizona Fall League. The Cubs also added him to their 40-man roster after the season.

Steele returned to the Smokies in 2019, going 0–6 with a 5.59 ERA over 11 starts. Steele did not play a minor league game in 2020 due to the cancellation of the minor league season caused by the COVID-19 pandemic. On August 2, 2020, Steele was promoted to the major leagues for the first time but was optioned down on August 6 without appearing in a game. On April 12, 2021, Steele was again promoted to the majors. He made his MLB debut that night against the Milwaukee Brewers, striking out the first batter he saw, Daniel Robertson.

Personal life
Steele and girlfriend Libby Murphy got engaged in May 2022.

References

External links

1995 births
Living people
Arizona League Cubs players
Baseball players from Mississippi
Chicago Cubs players
Eugene Emeralds players
Major League Baseball pitchers
Mesa Solar Sox players
Myrtle Beach Pelicans players
People from Lucedale, Mississippi
South Bend Cubs players
Tennessee Smokies players